The 1982 Richmond WCT Classic was a men's tennis tournament played on indoor carpet courts at the Richmond Coliseum in Richmond, Virginia, United States. The event was part of 1982 World Championship Tennis circuit. It was the 17th edition of the tournament and was held from February 8 through February 14, 1982. First-seeded José Luis Clerc won the singles title and earned $100,000 first-prize money.

Finals

Singles
 José Luis Clerc defeated  Fritz Buehning 3–6, 6–3, 6–4, 6–3
 It was Clerc' 1st singles title of the year and the 17th of his career.

Doubles
 Kim Warwick /  Mark Edmondson defeated  Syd Ball /  Rolf Gehring 6–4, 6–2

References

External links
 ITF tournament edition details

Richmond
Richmond WCT Classic
Richmond WCT Classic
Richmond WCT Classic